Events in the year 1844 in Germany.

Incumbents
 King of Bavaria – Ludwig I of Bavaria
 King of Hanover – Ernest Augustus
 King of Prussia – Frederick William IV
 King of Saxony – Frederick Augustus II
 King of Württemberg – William I of Württemberg
 Grand Duke of Baden – Leopold, Grand Duke of Baden

Events
 15 March – opening of Gößnitz station

Undated
 Rabbinical Conference of Brunswick

Establishments
 Freiburger Turnerschaft von 1844
 Roemer- und Pelizaeus-Museum Hildesheim
 Waggonfabrik Fuchs

Births 
 3 January – Hermann Eggert, German architect (died 1920)
 16 January – Paul Singer, German politician (died 1911)
 14 February – Joseph Thyssen, German industrialist (died 1915)
 10 March – Karl Gutbrod, German judge (died 1905)
 25 March – Adolf Engler, German botanist (died 1930)
 3 April – Georg Ratzinger, priest and politician (died 1899)
 30 April – Carl von Thieme, German banker (died 1924)
 17 May – Julius Wellhausen, biblical scholar (died 1918)
 6 August – Alfred, Duke of Saxe-Coburg and Gotha (died 1900)
 30 August – Friedrich Ratzel, German geographer and ethnographer (died 1904)
 13 September – Ludwig von Falkenhausen, German general (died 1936)
 15 October – Friedrich Nietzsche, German philosopher, cultural critic, composer, poet, philologist (died 1900)
 24 November – Friedrich Jolly, neurologist (died 1904)
 25 November – Carl Benz, German engine designer and automobile engineer (died 1929)

Deaths
 8 March – Theresia Anna Maria von Brühl, pastellist (born 1784)
 11 May – Georg Ludwig Engelhard Krebs, apothecary and natural history collector (born 1792)
 16 May – Joseph Knauer, Bishop of Wroclaw (born 1764)
 4 August – Christian Friedrich Illgen, Protestant theologian (born 1786)

References

 
Years of the 19th century in Germany
Germany
Germany